WVUB (91.1 FM, "Blazer 91.1") is a radio station in Vincennes, Indiana, United States. It uses a shortened version of the school's mascot, the Trailblazers, in its moniker.

The station broadcasts an adult album alternative ("Triple-A") format, along with newscasts from NPR, and serves as a training ground for students enrolled in Vincennes University's broadcasting program. Students also gather and produce local news for WVUB and WVUT television, also a service of the university.

History
On September 2, 1970, the FCC awarded a construction permit to Vincennes University to build a new noncommercial radio station on 91.3 MHz. The station began broadcasting on that frequency on December 7, 1970, before being approved in 1973 to move to 91.1 MHz at 50,000 watts, a change carried out the next year.

Prior to 2021, the station broadcast a hot adult contemporary format. The current Triple-A format was instituted in 2019 on the station's HD Radio subchannel, "ALT 91", as an additional outlet for student involvement.

References

External links
 
 

VUB
WVUB
Vincennes University
Vincennes, Indiana
VUB
1970 establishments in Indiana
Radio stations established in 1970
Adult album alternative radio stations in the United States